Vukašin Brajić (born 9 February 1984) is a Bosnian Serb pop-rock singer who rose to fame after participating in the first season (2008–09) of Operacija trijumf, the ex-Yugoslav version of Star Academy, in which he came in second place.

He represented Bosnia and Herzegovina, the country of his birth, at Eurovision Song Contest 2010 in Oslo, Norway, with the song "Thunder and Lightning".

Early life
Vukašin Brajić is the eldest of three children of Simo and Dušanka Brajić. He has a younger brother and sister, Nenad and Nevena. His interest in music started early, in the third grade, when he asked his parents to let him enroll in a music school, which was not possible in the time of war. In 1994, due to the Bosnian War, his family moved from Bosnia and Hercegovina to Serbia, to Mali Požarevac in Sopot, where they spent one year before moving to Čačak, where the Brajić family lives today. Vukašin finished both elementary and high school in Čačak. His music beginnings are also related to Čačak.

Although his parents could not afford his musical education, Vukašin studied by himself, learning from the books and Internet. That is how he acquired his keyboards and guitar skills. He got his first guitar from his uncle before he turned fifteen and then said to his family: "Someday, this guitar will feed all of you".

He also sang in the choir, danced in the dance studio "Luna" and was a member of a drama club. That is how he gained experience in public performances and contests. When he was 19 years old, he moved from Čačak to Negotin where he enrolled the Teacher Education Academy which provided him what he liked – scene movement, music and singing.

Affect

While he was on his third year of college, he moved from Negotin to Belgrade. Namely, in 2003 in Negotin, he met Darko Nikodijević and Nemanja Anđelković  who recorded a few songs with a melodic metal-rock sound and decided to form a band, naming it "Affect". Since they did not have the lead vocal and, realizing that Vukašin is a good singer who loves music and plays the guitar, they asked him to join the band. In the summer of 2004, Vukašin recorded four songs with them. He liked the songs and quickly identified himself with them. In the early 2005, Affect was fully formed, after the bassist Nikola Dimitijević and the drummer Željko Despić joined the band. Due to the poor conditions, they worked on ten songs until the end of 2006.  In the summer of 2006, they contacted Ognjen Uzelac, the director of "PGP-RTS" (label company), who offered to release Affect's promotional cd-single with two songs on it. In the fall of 2006, in studio 5 of PGP-RTS, they recorded two songs: "Read from my eyes" (in Serbian "Ništa više ne ostaje") and an instrumental cover of traditional Serbian song "Ajde Jano", which they played in heavy-metal style. In April 2007, they released promo-single in 150 copies. They performed live in Belgrade clubs where rock’n’roll was played, and with the help of "Beograd 202" radio, they also performed outside of Belgrade. For many reasons, one being that Vukašin was the only one who wanted to pursue professional music career, Affect was put on "stand by" in late 2007. However, Darko Nikodijević and Nemanja Anđelković would still work with Vukašin on future projects as parts of his team.

Lucky Luke
After the Affect episode, Vukašin continued to perform with Marko Marić in an acoustic duo "Lucky Luke" (ex "Ausonia Duo"). The two of them played together until Vukašin entered Operacija Trijumf. They also had several TV appearances in morning shows and daily chronicles.

Operacija Trijumf
Vukašin's Operacija Trijumf story began when his roommate from Negotin called and told him that the application process had begun, so his godfather Marko filled the application form. Vukašin, who was in Negotin at the time, dedicating himself to college, immediately started with preparations. He went back to Belgrade and spent all the money he earned from gigs on singing classes with Professor Tanja Andrejić, with whom he worked for three months. After passing the auditions, he did a few promotional concerts across Serbia during the summer with other Serbian contestants from the show.

The show started on 29 September 2008. At the first Gala Vukašin sang two songs alongside Ivana Nikodijević: "Kada padne noć" by Riblja Čorba and "Enter Sandman" by Metallica. He got his first nomination at the second Gala already, but did not get the explanation as to why he was nominated. He was then saved by the academy. At the eight Gala he got his first nomination after which he was left to the mercy of the audience and their votes. In a close "battle" with Đorđe Gogov, who was audience favorite more than once, Vukašin managed to go to the next round. On the same night, he performed "More Than Words" by Extreme, which remains as one of his best performances in which he showed his acoustic guitar skills. Later that night he performed "Are You Gonna Go My Way" by Lenny Kravitz alongside Đorđe Gogov. The series of nominations continued at the next Gala, and he was again dependent on the audience voting. At the 10th Gala he was nominated again, this time with Nikola Sarić. After the audience chose him over Nikola Sarić, who was also the audience favorite more than once, Vukašin earned a nickname "killer of the favorites". He ended the competition as the 1st runner up, behind the winner Adnan Babajić. Official statistic states that he received around 330 000 votes.

Vukašin stood out with many things during the show and got the support of the audience of all ages and from all the parts of the former Socialist Federal Republic of Yugoslavia. It was said that he was the man who reunited people from all the former republics. He is remembered by his excellent vocal and stage performances, which, as the jury evaluated, brought him the "highest average grade of all students". He is also remembered by his statement: "People who write on forums are the worst. And I am one of them!" which made him a favorite in the forum community.

Performing and results

Post-OT career

After the OT, Vukašin became a member of "OT Bend" along with three more Operacija Trijumf participants (Nikola Paunović, Nikola Sarić and Đorđe Gogov).

On 23 February 2009, Vukašin, among the other members of "OT Bend" and Sonja Bakić, performed as an opening act to a world-famous music star James Blunt at his Belgrade concert.

"OT Bend" entered the "Beovizija 2009", Serbian Song Contest for the Eurovision Song Contest 2009 with the song "Blagoslov za Kraj", written by E.Owen, S. Vukomanovic and E. Botric. On 7 March, in the semi-finals, they won maximum 24 points and entered the finals as the 1st. Next day, in the finals, again they won maximum 12 points from the audience, with 28 521 votes of totally 53 550. That was still not enough for the victory, because this time, the jury gave them only 5 points, so they finished the contest as the 1st runner up.

On 19 and 20 April 2009, Vukašin, alongside other Operacija Trijumf participants, held two concerts in Sava Centar in Belgrade in front of 10000 people.  He performed "OT Bend" songs and several national and international hits.

During the summer of 2009, first Operacija Trijumf contestants went on a Montenegro tour. High point of the tour was the concert in Podgorica in front of the full stadium called ("Stadion malih sportova").

At the summer music festival "Sunčane skale 2009" in Herceg Novi, on the first night called "Prince awards" ("Prinčeve nagrade"), OT Bend won the "breakthrough of the year" award.

On 12 July 2009, in Belgrade Arena, OT Bend, alongside Ana Bebić, performed at the closing ceremony of the 25th Summer Universiade, which gathered 8200 participants from 145 countries in the capital city of Serbia.

Former students of Operacija Trijumf also held several concerts in cities across Serbia. One of the most noticed was the one of OT Bend and Ana Bebić at the main city square of Užice, in front of around 10000 people.

"Farewell concert of Operacija Trijumf" in Sava Centar, Belgrade, was left for the end of the year. That way, students had the opportunity to say goodbye to the group appearances under the name – Operacija Trijumf and marked the beginning of their own separate careers.

Artistic ensemble of Ministry of Defence "Stanislav Binički", under the conductor Vojkan Borisavljević, held a concert named "Mamma mia" in "Dom sindikata" in Belgrade, where they performed hits from the Swedish band ABBA. OT Bend, alongside Maja Odžaklijevska, Nada Pavlović, Tijana Dapčević, Jelena Jovičić, Milena Vasić, Dejan Lutkić and Marinko Madžgalj performed as vocal backup, under the sponsorship of Swedish Embassy in Serbia. Special guest was prima donna of Belgrade Opera, Jadranka Jovanović.

Eurovision Song Contest
On 11 January 2010, announcement was made that Vukašin Brajić, with the song "Thunder and Lightning" by Edin-Dino Šaran, would represent Bosnia and Herzegovina at Eurovision Song Contest 2010 in Oslo, Norway. Bosnia and Herzegovina passed to the final of the contest and, among 25 countries which made it to the final, took 17th place.

Singles

OT Band singles
2009: "Blagoslov za kraj"
2009: "Strpi se još malo"
2009: "Zaboravi" feat. Karolina Goceva
2013: "TBA"

Solo singles
2010: "Thunder and Lightning" / "Munja i grom"
2010: "Od svega umoran" feat. AlogiA
 2013: "Mogli smo sve"
2014: "Na usnama"

References

External links

Official Website

Vukašin Brajić on Official Website Operacija Trijumf
Vukašin @samo-opusteno.info

1984 births
Living people
People from Sanski Most
Serbs of Bosnia and Herzegovina
Serbian rock singers
21st-century Serbian male singers
Eurovision Song Contest entrants for Bosnia and Herzegovina
Eurovision Song Contest entrants of 2010
21st-century Bosnia and Herzegovina male singers
Yugoslav Wars refugees
Refugees in Serbia
Bosnia and Herzegovina emigrants to Serbia